Yeke may refer to:

Yeke Kingdom (1856–1891), in Katanga, DR Congo
Yeke people, or Garanganze people, in Katanga, DR Congo
Yeke Juu League, current Ordos City, in Inner Mongolia, China
Yé ké yé ké, famous African song by Mory Kanté
"Yeke Yeke", a song by Werrason featuring Bikorine & But Na Fillet, 2020
Yekke, a Jew of German-speaking origin.